Thenmadom Mathew Varghese (1920 – 10 January 1979) was an Indian professional footballer who played as a defender and was also known as Thiruvalla Pappan and Tata Pappan.

He began his football career at the age of 16 by playing for Thiruvalla Town Club. He was inducted into Travancore State Police team by the first Inspector-general of police Khan Bahadur Sayid Abdul Karim Sahib Suhrawady. Then he was handpicked into Tata Sports Club, Mumbai. He had represented Tata SC for Santosh Trophy tournaments. From there he found his way to the India national football team.

T. Varghese represented India at the 1948 Summer Olympics and was considered one of the best defenders for India during the 1940s and 1950s. He is the first Malayali to participate in a team event in Olympic Games (1948 Olympics) and also the second Malayali to ever participate in Olympics. He was part of the Indian football team which won gold medal in Asian Games 1951.

After retiring from field he was associated with Tata Football Academy in Bombay for some period as a trainer. He died in 1979 while at Bombay.

He was married to Saramma and the family had four children including three daughters namely Lilian, Shanta Alex and Ann and a son named Mathew Varghese, who also died.

Honours

India
Asian Games Gold medal: 1951

See also 

 List of Kerala Olympians
 C. K. Lakshmanan

References

External links
 

1920 births
1979 deaths
People from Thiruvalla
Indian footballers
Association football defenders
Footballers from Kerala
India international footballers
Olympic footballers of India
Footballers at the 1948 Summer Olympics
Footballers at the 1951 Asian Games
Footballers at the 1954 Asian Games
Medalists at the 1951 Asian Games
Asian Games gold medalists for India
Asian Games medalists in football
Mumbai Football League players